The Administrator of Ascension is the head of government and representative of the Governor of St Helena, Ascension and Tristan da Cunha in Ascension Island. The role of the Administrator includes that of chairing the territory's Island Council which consists of five or seven elected members. The Administrator of Ascension is formally referred to as "His Honour" or "Her Honour."

As a part of the British overseas territory of Saint Helena, Ascension and Tristan da Cunha the head of state is Charles III, with the Governor appointed by the British government to act as his local representative. The first Administrator was appointed in 1942.

Since 2009, the Administrator is appointed in accordance with Section 147 of the Constitution of St Helena, Ascension and Tristan da Cunha. They are ordinarily appointed for a period of up to three years and are usually an official of the UK Government Foreign, Commonwealth and Development Office (FCDO). 

Under Section 183(3) of the Constitution it is possible to appoint a person to perform the functions of an office whilst the appointed person is unable to do so "whether by reason of absence or infirmity of body or mind or any other cause", including the office of the Administrator. Under such circumstances, whilst that person will not have been appointed Administrator, the powers and duties of that role under local legislation can still be executed.

Commandants, 1815–1922

Resident-magistrates, 1922–1964

Administrators, 1964–present

References

External links
 Government of Ascension Island
 Chronology and lists of commanding officers, resident-magistrates and administrators

 
Ascension Island